Sexau (Low Alemannic: Säxoi) is a village in the district of Emmendingen in Baden-Württemberg in Germany.

Geography
Sexau is at the beginning of the valley "Brettenbachtal". It is located on the crossing from the region of the Black Forest ("Schwarzwald") to the plains of the river Rhein ("Rheinebene").

Mayor
Michael Goby was elected mayor for the first time in 2001. He was reelected in March 2009.

References

External links
  Official Webpage
  Sexau: History and images

Emmendingen (district)
Baden